Maurice Emile Borgeaud from the European Space Agency (ESA), Frascati, Rome, Italy was named Fellow of the Institute of Electrical and Electronics Engineers (IEEE) in 2013 for leadership in microwave remote sensing from spaceborne systems and retrieval of bio-physical and geo-physical parameters for land applications.

References 

Fellow Members of the IEEE
Living people
Year of birth missing (living people)
Place of birth missing (living people)